Morten Djupvik (born 27 April 1972) is a Norwegian show jumping competitor.

At the 2008 Summer Olympics in Beijing, Djupvik originally won the bronze medal as part of the Norwegian team in team jumping, together with Stein Endresen, Geir Gulliksen, and Tony Andre Hansen. However, the team lost its medal and finished tenth following the disqualification of Tony Andre Hansen.

References

1972 births
Norwegian male equestrians
Equestrians at the 2008 Summer Olympics
Living people
Olympic equestrians of Norway
Place of birth missing (living people)
Competitors stripped of Summer Olympics medals
21st-century Norwegian people